Badr Rural District may refer to:
 Badr Rural District (Kermanshah Province)
 Badr Rural District (Kurdistan Province)